Adendema is a village in western Eritrea. It is located 5.8 miles south-west of the district capital of Haykota in Haykota District in the Gash-Barka region. It lies on the north-east boundary of the Gash-Setit wildlife reserve.

Nearby towns and villages include Bitama (13.4 nm), Elit (7.0 nm), Moso (23.9 nm), Geniti (13.3 nm) and Giamal Biscia (9.1 nm).

Villages in Eritrea